List of ships present at the International Fleet Review, Sydney, October 2013.

Royal Australian Navy representatives

Frigate 
 HMAS Sydney
 HMAS Darwin
 HMAS Parramatta
 HMAS Perth
 HMAS Stuart

Patrol Boat 
 HMAS Broome
 HMAS Bundaberg

Submarines 
 HMAS Farncomb

Support & Auxiliary Vessels 
 HMAS Benalla
 HMAS Diamantina
 HMAS Huon
 HMAS Gascoyne
 HMAS Leeuwin
 HMAS Shepparton
 HMAS Success
 HMAS Tobruk
 HMAS Yarra

Offshore support ships 
 ADV Ocean Shield (civilian operated)

Landing ships 
 HMAS Labuan
 HMAS Tarakan

International Naval representatives

Amphibious transport dock

Republic of Singapore Navy 
 RSS Endeavour

Cruisers

United States Navy 
 USS Chosin

Destroyers

Royal Navy 
 HMS Daring

Japan Maritime Self-Defense Force 
 JS Makinami

People's Liberation Army Navy 
 PLANS Qingdao

Frigates

French Navy 
 Vendémiaire

Indian Navy 
 INS Sahyadri

Malaysian Navy 
 KD Jebat

Royal New Zealand Navy 
 HMNZS Te Mana

Corvettes

Indonesian Navy 
 KRI Sultan Iskandar Muda

Patrol ships

Royal Brunei Navy 
 KDB Darulaman

Royal Thai Navy 
 HTMS Krabi

Nigerian Navy 
 , a former Hamilton-class US Coast Guard cutter, was the sole vessel from an African nation.

Replenishment oilers

Spanish Navy

Non-naval ships

Australian

Tall ships 

 STS Young Endeavour
 James Craig
 Lady Nelson (replica)
 Windeward Bound
 HM Bark Endeavour (replica)
 Southern Swan
 Søren Larsen
 Coral Trekker
 South Passage
 Rainbow Gypsy

Steam launch 
 Lady Hopetoun

Patrol boat 

 ex-HMAS Advance

Netherlands 
 Oosterschelde
 Tecla
 Europa

New Zealand 
 Spirit of New Zealand

British 
 STS Lord Nelson

Cook Islands 
 Picton Castle

References

Notes

External links 

 Participating Warships, Royal Australian Navy Website
 Ship Schedule, Sydney Ports Website | Google Cached Version at 6 Oct 2013 04:50:18 GMT

International Fleet Review 2013
International Fleet Review 2013 ships